Anne Aanestad Winter is a Norwegian handball player. She played 55 matches for the Norway women's national handball team between 1974 and 1977.  She participated at the 1975 World Women's Handball Championship, where the Norwegian team placed 8th.

References

Year of birth missing (living people)
Living people
Norwegian female handball players